Omoikane (思兼 or 思金) is a Shinto god of wisdom and intelligence. His name means "serving one's thoughts." A heavenly deity who is called upon to "ponder" and give good counsel in the deliberations of the heavenly deities. In the myth where Amaterasu hid in a cave, he was tasked to find a way to get her out.

He is known by other names as Tokoyo-no-Omoikane (常世思金神) in the Kojiki (古事記); Omoikane (思兼神) in the Nihon Shoki (日本書紀); Omokane (思金神, 思兼神), Tokoyo-no-Omoikane (常世思金神), Yagokoro-omoikane (八意思兼神, 八意思金神) in the Kujiki (旧事紀 or Sendai Kuji Hongi 先代旧事本紀), or Achihiko (阿智彦).

He is the son of creator deity Takamimusubi (高御産巣日神) and the older brother of Takuhatachiji-hime (栲幡千千姫命, or commonly named in the Kojiki: 万幡豊秋津師比売命 Yorozuhatatoyo'akitsushi-hime), who is the wife of the deity Ame-no-Oshihomimi (天忍穂耳命). 

However in the Kujiki (旧事紀 or Sendai Kuji Hongi 先代旧事本紀). Omoikane descends to Shinano Province (信濃国 Shinano-no-kuni, a former province that is now Nagano Prefecture) to become the ancestor Shina-no-achihouri (信之阿智祝) and as in Chichibu Province (知々夫国, Chichibu no kuni), a former province in Saitama Prefecture. He then becomes the father of both deities Ame-no-Uwaharu (天表春命) and Ame-no-Shitaharu (天下春命), also through this lineage become the patriarchal ancestor of the children of Ama-no-Koyane (天児屋命, 天児屋根命).

See also
 Amaterasu
 Benzaiten
 Kuebiko
 Tenjin

References

External links
Omoikane, Encyclopedia of Shinto
Omoikane - History of Japan Database

Japanese gods
Wisdom gods
Shinto kami
Amatsukami